Alessandro Trentacinque (also known as Alessandro Trentacinque d'Aquila, Alexander Trentacinquis, and Alexander Trentacinquius, 1541-1599), was a jurist,  writer and patrician from L'Aquila, Italy. The Trentacinque family was also present in Lucoli. Alessandro Trentacinque was mayor of L'Aquila around 1583, carried the noble title of Camerlengo (Chamberlain) and was buried in the Sant'Agostino church in L'Aquila.

Publications
 with Damiano Zenaro and Giovanni Battista Natolini: De substitutionibus, tractatus, hanc ultimarum volontatum præcipuam materiam, aliarumque omnium in jure difficillimam distinctè & ordinatè atque acutissimè explicans, ut omnes tam in scholis, quàm in foro versantes, nihil commodius, nihil utilius, nihil denique opportunius desiderare queant. Cum summariis et indice locupletissimis., Venice, Damiano Zenaro, 1588
 Variarum resolutionum libri tres, Venice, Evangelista Deuchino and Giovanni Battista Pulciano, 1609
 Practicarum Resolutionum Juris Libri Tres: Omnes Fere Juris Vtriusque In Foro, Ac Praxi quotidie occurrentes controversias, ac quaestiones ... continentes : Cum Indice Gemino, Uno Resolutionum, Altero Rerum & Verborum memorabilium, 1610
 Consiliorum sive responsorum clarissimi viri Alexandri Trentacinquii patricii aquilani i.v. doctoris: indice rerum aeque ac sententiarum serie alphabetica methodice digesto pro operis mole sat copioso adornatum, Venice, Evangelista Deuchino and Giovanni Battista Pulciano, 1610

References

1541 births
1599 deaths
16th-century Italian jurists
16th-century Italian writers
16th-century male writers
16th-century Latin-language writers